Radessa is a genus of moths of the family Crambidae.

Species
Radessa pardalota Munroe, 1977
Radessa vittilimbalis Munroe, 1977

References

Natural History Museum Lepidoptera genus database

Pyraustinae
Crambidae genera
Taxa named by Eugene G. Munroe